"Slowdive" is a song by English post-punk band Siouxsie and the Banshees. It was released in 1982 by record label Polydor as the first single from the band's fifth studio album, A Kiss in the Dreamhouse.

Music 
The song (and the album) was representative of Siouxsie and the Banshees' more elaborate and experimental musical direction at the time. The overtones of the song were accentuated by a string section, including violins and a cello. AllMusic later described "Slowdive" as "a violin-colored dance beat number" with "a catchy melodic hook". The Guardian'''s music critic Dave Simpson deemed it one of the band's very best recordings, noting that it "sounds like the lid being slowly released on a pressure cooker, as the band emerge from the black and flit from suspense to sensuality. They change course again musically, too, switching from brooding rock to psychedelic pop".

 Release 
"Slowdive" was released on 1 October 1982 by record label Polydor. The song just missed becoming a top 40 hit, peaking at number 41 in the UK Singles Chart.

The song's release on 12" vinyl included an extended version (which would be released on the expanded, remastered edition of A Kiss in the Dreamhouse in 2009) and an instrumental version of the third track on Dreamhouse'', "Obsession", titled "Obsession II".

Music Video

The music video was directed by Clive Richardson and filmed in a hangar at the Isle of Dogs, London. The video is a performance video and shows the band in a large room lit up with a variety of concert-style spotlights. Siouxsie is shown swinging on a large trapeze while the other members of the band perform a dance routine on the floor below her. The dance routines were choreographed by Ginette Landray.

Legacy
The title of the song inspired the name of the band Slowdive in the early 1990s, as later confirmed by the latter's members in interviews.

"Slowdive" was covered by LCD Soundsystem in January 2005 for an XFM radio session and was also released as the B-side of their "Disco Infiltrator" single. “Slowdive” was a consistent part of LCD Soundsystem's live set in 2005, serving as the show closer.

Track listing 

 7" single

 12" single

Personnel 
 Siouxsie and the Banshees

 Siouxsie Sioux – vocals 
 Steven Severin – six-string bass guitar 
 John McGeoch – guitar
 Budgie – drums, percussion, harmonica

 Additional personnel

 Anne Stephenson – violin
 Virginia Hewes – violin

References 

1982 singles
Siouxsie and the Banshees songs
Polydor Records singles
Songs written by Siouxsie Sioux
Songs written by Budgie (musician)
Songs written by Steven Severin
Songs written by John McGeoch
1982 songs
Psychedelic pop songs